Thelma Cazalet-Keir CBE (née Cazalet; 28 May 1899 – 13 January 1989) was a British feminist and Conservative Party politician.

Early life
Thelma Cazalet was born in London, the third child - of four - and only daughter, of William Marshall Cazalet (1865–1932), and Maud Lucia, née Heron-Maxwell (died 1952). Her father was a wealthy socialite, and in her childhood she met many leading figures of the day, including Rudyard Kipling, Sylvia Pankhurst and Beatrice Webb. Her mother was a feminist Christian Scientist and a strong influence on her daughter. Her eldest brother, Edward, was killed in the Great War, serving as an officer in the newly formed Welsh Guards, at Fricourt in 1916; the middle brother, Victor, served and survived and was also awarded the Military Cross; the youngest, Peter, was still a schoolboy.

Cazalet was educated at home by governesses, and later attended lectures at the London School of Economics. She was a close friend of Megan Lloyd George, the daughter of Prime Minister David Lloyd George and later a Member of Parliament (MP) herself.

Political career
Cazalet entered local politics in Kent, where the family had their country house, Fairlawne, in Shipbourne. Then, in 1924, she was elected to the London County Council, remaining a councillor for seven years, until she became an alderman in 1931.

In 1931, Miss Cazalet stood for Parliament at the Islington East by-election, finishing third in a four-way contest.  She was soon back in the Islington East constituency, contesting the general election in October of the same year, when she gained the seat for the Conservatives from the by-election winner, Labour's Leah Manning.  She then held the seat until her defeat at the 1945 general election, when the seat went to the Labour candidate, Eric Fletcher.

In the Commons, she joined her brother Victor, the Member for Chippenham, in Wiltshire.
On the outbreak of the Second World War, her brother - retaining his seat 'for the duration' - returned to military service, but this time he too was killed, in Gibraltar in 1943.

Thelma's youngest brother, Peter, also served in this war and survived. He fought in Normandy in 1944, as a Guards officer, reaching the rank of Major.
He made his name in the world of horse-racing, initially as an amateur rider, nearly winning the Grand National, but then as a trainer. After the war, Major Peter Cazalet resumed his career as a trainer and became the trainer for Her Majesty Queen Elizabeth The Queen Mother.
Just as Cazalet was thwarted in winning the Grand National as a rider, he was famously denied the victory as a trainer, when Devon Loch, ridden by Dick Francis, fell 50 metres from the winning-post, in the 1956 Grand National.

Later life
In August 1939, she married David Edwin Keir, a parliamentary correspondent. Partly for feminist reasons but partly for practical political name-recognition, she now became known as Mrs. Cazalet-Keir. There were no children.

Her proposed amendment to the Education Bill, demanding for equal pay for women teachers, passed by one vote on 28 March 1944. Churchill made the amendment a matter of confidence, and attended in person to ensure its defeat on 30 March. This was one of the events which made Churchill and the Conservatives appear reactionary, contributing to their election defeat in 1945.

Outside of parliament, Cazalet-Keir was a member of the Arts Council and, later, a Governor of the BBC. In recognition of her public service, she was appointed Commander of the Order of the British Empire in 1952. Cazalet-Keir was a keen feminist and supported the Fawcett Society, becoming the President of the organisation in 1964. She was also a devoted supporter of the Women's Engineering Society, which collaborated with her in her equal pay campaign.  In 1967, she wrote her autobiography. For many years, she lived in Kent, at Raspit Hill, not far from her childhood home, but when she was widowed, in 1969, she sold the house and its 75 acres to Malcolm MacDonald, and moved to her London flat in Belgravia. She died in 1989 at Eaton Square at age 89.

References 

 Dictionary of National Biography: Thelma Cazalet-Keir
From the Wings: An Autobiography by Thelma Cazalet-Keir (The Bodley Head, London, 1967)
 
 Howard, Anthony RAB: The Life of R. A. Butler, Jonathan Cape 1987

External links 
 

1899 births
1989 deaths
Members of London County Council
Conservative Party (UK) MPs for English constituencies
Female members of the Parliament of the United Kingdom for English constituencies
UK MPs 1931–1935
UK MPs 1935–1945
Politics of the London Borough of Islington
Commanders of the Order of the British Empire
English feminists
20th-century British women politicians
Thelma
Ministers in the Churchill caretaker government, 1945
20th-century English women
20th-century English people
Women councillors in England